Krasnodubrovsk (Qıźıl Dubrovka) is a rural locality (a village) in Belsky Selsoviet, Gafuriysky District, Bashkortostan, Russia. The population was 12 as of 2010. There is 1 street.

Geography 
Krasnodubrovsk is located 12 km northwest of Krasnousolsky (the district's administrative centre) by road. Rodina is the nearest rural locality.

References 

Rural localities in Gafuriysky District